The 2002 Speed World Challenge was the 13th running of the Sports Car Club of America's premier series. It began on March 15 and ran for eleven rounds. The name was changed from SpeedVision World Challenge due to the network changing its name from SpeedVision to Speed Channel.

Results

References

Speed World Challenge
GT World Challenge America